The Gola Ghar (Assamese for 'Cannon House') is a historical monument located in Joysagar, 4 km from Sivasagar, Assam. It is an ammunition store house used by the Ahoms and is situated near the Talatal Ghar. The Gola Ghar was built during the reign of Chakradhwaj Singha (1663-1669 AD).

The Gola Ghar is a protected monument under Archaeological Survey of India. Recently, it has been renovated as a museum gallery. It displays various weapons, arms, armour, process of making gunpowder, etc.

Structure 
Architecturally it is a rectangular brick hut with two-layered roof. The Gola Ghar is 22.8 metres long, 11.7 metres wide and the walls are 2.15 metres thick. There are circular holes in front and back and also multiple square holes for ventilation.

See also 
 Rang Ghar
 Kareng Ghar

References 

Sivasagar district
Tourist attractions in Assam
Buildings and structures in Assam
17th century in the Ahom kingdom
1660s establishments in India
Ahom kingdom